Sergi Canós Tenés (born 2 February 1997) is a Spanish professional footballer who plays as a winger for Super League Greece club Olympiacos, on loan from  club Brentford.

Canós began his career in the Barcelona Academy and transferred to the Liverpool Academy in 2013. A fringe player at both Liverpool and his next club Norwich City, Canós transferred to Brentford in 2017, for whom he had previously played on loan from Liverpool during the 2015–16 season. By April 2021, he had made 200 appearances for the club. Canós represented Spain between U15 and U19 level and has been described as a "quick attacking player". He is also a utility player, being adept as a winger, forward, attacking midfielder or right wing back.

Club career

Early career
Born in Nules, Castellón, Valencian Community, Canós began his career in the youth systems at Nules, CD Castellón and Espanyol, before rejecting attention from Valencia, Villareal and Atlético Madrid to join Barcelona's academy in 2010. Able to play as a winger or forward, he left La Masia in 2013.

Liverpool
Canós moved to England to sign for Premier League club Liverpool at the age of 16 in 2013. After receiving international clearance in November 2013, he progressed through the U18 team during the 2013–14 season to make his debut for the club's reserves in August 2014. Canós appeared in every match of Liverpool's 2014–15 UEFA Youth League campaign and scored one goal.

On 31 August 2015, Canós joined Championship club Brentford on a loan which was later extended until the end of the 2015–16 season. He made the first senior appearance of his career as a late substitute for Philipp Hofmann in a 1–1 draw with Leeds United at Elland Road on 12 September. He made regular substitute appearances and scored the first senior goal of his career versus Nottingham Forest on 21 November, scoring within three minutes after coming on for John Swift. After the appointment of Dean Smith as manager in December, Canós broke into the starting lineup and the day after extending his loan, he scored Brentford's Goal of the Season versus Reading on 28 December. He scored four further goals during the second half of the season and finished with seven goals from 39 appearances.

Canós returned to Anfield in time to be included in Jürgen Klopp's squad for the final match of the 2015–16 Premier League season versus West Bromwich Albion. He made what would be his only senior appearance for Liverpool as a late substitute for Sheyi Ojo in the 1–1 draw. Canós departed the club on 12 July 2016.

Norwich City
On 13 July 2016, Canós signed a four-year contract with Championship club Norwich City for an undisclosed fee, reported to be an initial £2.5 million, which could have risen to £4.5 million. He was largely out of favour at Carrow Road and featured mainly in cup competitions, scoring his first goals for the club with a brace in a 6–1 EFL Cup second round thrashing of Coventry City on 23 August 2016. Canós scored for the U23 team in a 5–0 EFL Trophy group stage win over Barnet on 4 October, but failed to break into the squad for league matches and left the club on 31 January 2017, after having made just 9 appearances during the first half of the 2016–17 season.

Return to Brentford

2016–17
On 31 January 2017, Canós rejoined Brentford on -year contract, with an option for a further year. The undisclosed fee (reported to be £2,500,000, rising to £4,500,000) made him the club's then-record signing. Canós made his second Brentford debut five days later, as a 69th-minute substitute for Florian Jozefzoon during a 3–3 draw with Brighton & Hove Albion. He scored the first goals since his return to Griffin Park with a brace in a 5–3 victory over Burton Albion on 18 March. Canós finished the 2016–17 season with four goals from 18 appearances.

2017–18 
An ankle injury, sustained during pre-season, ruled Canós out of the early matches of the 2017–18 season. He made his first appearance of the season with a start versus Aston Villa on 9 September 2017, but lasted just 33 minutes of the 0–0 draw before suffering a recurrence of the same injury. He made his second return of the season as a late substitute in a 3–3 draw with Sunderland on 21 October and scored his first goal of the season on his eighth appearance, in a 3–1 win over West London rivals Fulham on 2 December. Canós was sent off for the first time in his career when he received a straight red card for a tackle on Derby County's Marcus Olsson in a match on 3 February 2018. He finished a "frustrating" 2017–18 season with 31 appearances and three goals.

2018–19
Canós featured predominantly as a starter through the first half of the 2018–19 season, before dropping to the bench. He regained his starting role late in the month and came into form in late-January and early-February 2019, scoring four goals in as many matches. A dearth of fit full-backs at the club led head coach Thomas Frank to deploy Canós as a right wing back in a number of matches during February 2019 and he finished the 2018–19 season with a career-high 50 appearances and 9 goals.

2019–20
Canós began the 2019–20 season as an ever-present starter on the wing, before suffering a serious knee injury in late in a match versus Nottingham Forest on 5 October 2019. Shortly afterwards, he signed a new four-year contract, with the option of a further year. Canós returned to outdoor training in February 2020 and due to the COVID-19 pandemic, the three-month suspension imposed on the season allowed him to make substitute appearances after the restart. Canós made 15 appearances during the 2019–20 season, which ended with defeat in the 2020 Championship play-off Final. In February 2021, Canós commented that the injury was "the best moment of my career" and made him improve his mentality and "understand why top players are playing in top leagues. I understand how much it takes".

2020–21
Due to the unavailability and subsequent departure on loan of Saïd Benrahma, Canós began the 2020–21 season primarily in a starting role on the left wing. His performances and four goals in December 2020 (which included the first hat-trick of his career, in 3–2 win over Cardiff City on Boxing Day) won him nominations for the Championship Player of the Month and PFA Fans' Championship Player of the Month awards. Canós finished the 2020–21 season with career highs in appearances (55) and goals (9) and celebrated promotion to the Premier League with victory in the 2021 Championship play-off Final.

2021–22
On the opening night of Brentford's 2021–22 season, Canós scored the club's first Premier League goal in a 2–0 win over Arsenal, with a low driving shot which was later voted the club's Goal of the Season. Aside from his natural wing role, during much the season Canós was often deployed as a right wing back and on occasion, as a forward. Following one month out with a thigh injury, Canós made his 35th appearance of the campaign on the final day of the Premier League season versus Leeds United. He entered the match as a substitute on 63 minutes and 12 minutes later, he levelled the score at 1–1 with his fourth goal of the season, a header. Booked for removing his shirt while celebrating, Canós received a second yellow card two minutes later for a tackle on Raphinha. Following Kristoffer Ajer's departure from the match injured in the 77th minute and with no substitutes remaining, Canós' sending off reduced Brentford to 9 men.

2022–23 
Following an appearance in Brentford's first match of the 2022–23 pre-season, a hamstring injury saw Canós miss the first month of the regular season. Restricted to sporadic substitute appearances and in competition with five other wide players, Canós joined Super League Greece club Olympiacos on loan until the end of the 2022–23 season on the final day of the winter transfer window. On his second appearance, five days after the death of his mother, Canós scored his first goal for the club in a 6–1 victory over Panetolikos.

International career
Canós made his international debut for Spain at U15 level and was a part of the team which reached the quarter-final of the 2012 Copa de México de Naciones. He progressed to play at U16 and U17 level, making six appearances and scoring two goals during the U17s' unsuccessful qualification campaign for the 2014 UEFA European Under-17 Championship.

Canós made his U19 debut in a friendly against Italy on 20 January 2016 and appeared in two of Spain's three 2016 European U19 Championship unsuccessful elite round qualifiers three months later.

Style of play
Canós has been described as "very good technically", "a quick attacking player", "someone who can dribble, can score goals and can provide assists" and who "unashamedly, wears his heart on his sleeve and thrives off the energy and passion of a paying crowd". He describes himself as "a player whose confidence is based on goals, assists, creating chances, crosses".

Personal life
Canós is a Valencia supporter. His family ran a Spanish restaurant, Gracias, on Penny Lane in Liverpool and as of April 2020, his mother and sister still lived in Liverpool.

Career statistics

Honours
Brentford
EFL Championship play-offs: 2021

Individual
Mediterranean International Cup Player of the Tournament: 2013

References

External links

Sergi Canós at brentfordfc.com
Sergi Canós at olympiacos.org

1997 births
Living people
People from Plana Baixa
Sportspeople from the Province of Castellón
Footballers from the Valencian Community
Spanish footballers
Spain youth international footballers
Association football wingers
Liverpool F.C. players
Brentford F.C. players
Norwich City F.C. players
English Football League players
Premier League players
Spanish expatriate footballers
Expatriate footballers in England
Spanish expatriate sportspeople in England
Expatriate footballers in Greece
Spanish expatriate sportspeople in Greece
Olympiacos F.C. players
Super League Greece players